Princess of Wales (Welsh: Tywysoges Cymru) is a courtesy title used by the wife of the heir apparent to the Monarchy of the United Kingdom.

The title was first recorded in an independent Wales by Eleanor de Montfort, wife of the native Prince of Wales, Llywelyn ap Gruffydd.

The conquest of Wales by Edward I began English rule in Wales, and ever since, the title has been used by the wife of the heir apparent to the English and later British throne. The current holder is Catherine (née Middleton).

Background 
Historically, several wives of native Welsh princes were theoretically princesses of Wales while their husbands were in power. Joan (or Siwan), Isabella de Braose and Elizabeth Ferrers were all married to princes of Wales, but it is not known if they assumed a title in light of their husbands' status.

Prior to 'Princess' the title of 'Queen' was used by some spouses of the rulers of Wales. Examples are Angharad ferch Owain, wife of Gruffudd ap Cynan, and Cristin verch Goronwy, wife of Gruffudd's son, Owain Gwynedd (specifically, she was known as 'Queen Dowager').  

Eleanor de Montfort is the first consort shown to have used the title. She was married to Llywelyn ap Gruffydd, one of the last native princes of Wales. Eleanor died shortly after giving birth to their only child, Gwenllian, who was taken prisoner as an infant following her father's death. 

Since 1301, the prince of Wales has been the heir apparent to the English and, after 1707, British throne. The title 'Princess of Wales' has never been held by a woman in her own right (suo jure), but always as the wife of the prince of Wales.

The title in independent Wales

Joan (Siwan) 
Joan, also known as Siwan (her Welsh name), was the illegitimate daughter of King John of England. She was the wife of Llywelyn the Great (initially king of Gwynedd), effective ruler of all of Wales. During her tenure, she used the titles 'Lady of Wales' and 'Lady of Snowdon'.

Eleanor de Montfort and Gwenllian 

Following her wedding ceremony in 1278, Eleanor de Montfort was officially known as princess of Wales. On 19 June 1282, she died giving birth to her first child, Gwenllian.

The infant was captured by English forces the following year, after her father, Llywelyn ap Gruffydd, was killed in December 1282. At Edward I's orders, she was kept in the remote Sempringham Priory in Lincolnshire, where she remained until her death in 1337.

Gwenllian's status was acknowledged at least once by the English Crown. When writing to the Pope, attempting to secure more money for Sempringham Priory, the king stated that "...herein is kept the Princess of Wales, whom we have to maintain". The title 'Princess of Wales' as used here did not have its usual accepted meaning.

Margaret Hanmer and Catrin, daughter of Glyndŵr 
Margaret Hanmer, sometimes known as Marred ferch Dafydd (her Welsh name), was the wife of Owain Glyndŵr. Some modern historians have accorded her the title 'Princess of Wales'.

Catrin was one of the children of Owain Glyndŵr and Margaret Hanmer. In November 1402, she married Sir Edmund Mortimer, the second son of Edmund Mortimer, 3rd Earl of March and through his mother, a great-grandson of Edward III of England.

Edmund Mortimer died during the siege of Harlech Castle in 1409, of unknown causes. Catrin was subsequently captured alongside her three daughters, and they were taken to the Tower of London, along with Catrin's mother and one of her sisters. The deaths and burials of Catrin and her daughters are recorded, but the causes of their deaths remain unknown. They were laid to rest at St Swithin's Church in London.

List

Spouse of the British (formerly English) heir apparent 
Cecily Neville, wife of Richard, 3rd Duke of York, is omitted from this list. While her husband was briefly given various titles, including prince of Wales, by an Act of Parliament as part of his arrangement to succeed Henry VI, he is not generally recognised as such and is not mentioned in any published summary of the topic.

Although not granted the title in her own right, the future Mary I was, during her youth, invested by her father, Henry VIII, with many of the rights and properties traditionally given to the prince of Wales, including the use of the official seal of Wales for correspondence. For most of her childhood, Mary was her father's only legitimate child, and for this reason, she was often referred to as the princess of Wales, although Henry never formally created her as such. For example, Spanish scholar Juan Luis Vives dedicated his Satellitium Animi to "Dominæ Mariæ Cambriæ Principi, Henrici Octavi Angliæ Regis Filiæ".

Welsh politicians suggested that George VI's elder daughter, Princess Elizabeth (the future Elizabeth II), be granted the title on her 18th birthday, but he rejected the idea because he felt such a title belonged solely to the wife of a prince of Wales and the prince of Wales had always been the heir apparent.

Camilla, Charles III’s second wife, was the princess of Wales from 2005 to 2022, but did not use the title due to its popular association with her husband's first wife, Diana.

On 9 September 2022, a day after his accession to the throne, Charles III bestowed the title of 'Prince of Wales' upon his elder son, Prince William, hence making his wife, Catherine, the new princess of Wales.

List

See also
Controversy of the Prince of Wales title
The Green Howards (Alexandra, Princess of Wales's Own Yorkshire Regiment)
The Princess of Wales' Own Regiment (Canada)

Notes

Bibliography
Princesses of Wales by Deborah Fisher. University of Wales Press, 2005.
 'Tystiolaeth Garth Celyn' Y Traethodydd 1998

Further reading

British monarchy
Wales
 
Titles